Laevityphis muticus is an extinct species of sea snail, a marine gastropod mollusk, in the family Muricidae, the murex snails or rock snails.

References

External links
  Sowerby, J. de C. (1826-1835). The mineral conchology of Great Britain; or coloured figures and descriptions of those remains of testaceous animals or shells, which have been preserved at various times and depths in the Earth. Vol. VI. London, privately published, pp. 1-230 + index 

muticus
Gastropods described in 1834